Finn Laudrup (born 31 July 1945) is a Danish former association football player who played as a forward. He represented a number of Danish clubs and played professionally with Wiener Sport-Club in Austria. He played 19 matches and scored six goals for the Denmark national football team. He is the father of former Denmark national team players Michael Laudrup and Brian Laudrup.

Club career
On club level, Finn Laudrup started at Vanløse IF in 1962 before he moved abroad to play professionally in Austria with Wiener Sportclub in 1968. He returned to the top-flight Danish 1st Division in 1971 for Brønshøj BK, before he moved a few leagues lower to become player/coach for the small-time club Brøndby IF in 1973. He went back to the 1st Division with Kjøbenhavns Boldklub (KB) in 1976, but would return to Brøndby in 1981, now in Danish 2nd Division. He played the 1981 season which ended in promotion for Brøndby. Before the 1982 season, Finn retired from football.

International career
Laudrup made his debut for the Danish national team on 24 May 1967, in a 2–0 against Hungary. He played seven more games that year, scoring four goals. As a professional, he was banned from the amateur-only national team. When he returned to Denmark, he went on to play a further ten games from May 1971 to November 1972. His final cap came several years later, when Denmark lost 2–1 against the Soviet Union in June 1979. In all, Finn Laudrup played 19 games and scored six goals for Denmark.

References

External links
Danish national team profile

Kjøbenhavns Boldklub players
Brøndby IF players
Danish expatriate men's footballers
Danish expatriate sportspeople in Austria
Danish men's footballers
Denmark international footballers
Denmark under-21 international footballers
Expatriate footballers in Austria
1945 births
Living people
Wiener Sport-Club players
Brønshøj Boldklub players
Vanløse IF players
Association football forwards
Sportspeople from Frederiksberg
Finn